Statistics of Swiss Super League in the 1972–73 season.

Overview
14 teams contested in the 1972–73 Nationalliga A. These were the top 12 teams from the previous 1971–72 season and the two newly promoted teams Chiasso and Fribourg. The championship was played in a double round robin. The champions would qualify for the 1973–74 European Cup, the second and third placed teams were to qualify for 1973–74 UEFA Cup and the last two teams in the table at the end of the season were to be relegated. Basel won the championship four points ahead of Grasshopper Club and six ahead of the Sion. Basel won 17 of their 26 league games, drew five and lost four. They scored a total of 57 goals conceding 30. Ottmar Hitzfeld (Basel) was joint leagues top goal scorer with Ove Grahn of Lausanne-Sports both with 18 league goals.

League standings

Results

References

Sources
Switzerland 1972–73 at RSSSF

Swiss Football League seasons
Swiss
1972–73 in Swiss football